Liga Deportiva Universitaria de Quito's 2010 season was the club's 80th year of existence, the 57th year in professional football, and the 49th in the top level of professional football in Ecuador. Former manager Edgardo Bauza returns to the position after Jorge Fossati left to sign with Internacional. While Liga unsuccessfully defended its 2009 title in the Copa Sudamericana and lost  the Suruga Bank Championship, they became the third team to win back-to-back Recopa Sudamericanas and won their tenth Serie A title.

Club
Personnel
President: Carlos Arroyo
President of the Football Commission: Edwin Ripalda
Principal directors: Rodrigo Paz & Esteban Paz
Sporting manager: Santiago Jácome
Coaching staff
Manager: Edgardo Bauza
Assistant manager: José Daniel di Leo
Physical trainer: Alejandro Mur
Goalkeeper trainer: Gustavo Flores
Statistician: Maximiliano Bauza
Kits

|}

Squad information

Current squad
Liga's squad for the season is allowed a maximum of four foreign players at any one time, and a maximum of eight throughout the season. The team must also register under-19 players to be used in every match of the league season. The jersey numbers in the main table (directly below) refer to the number on their domestic league jersey. For each CONMEBOL competition, Liga must register 25 players, whose jerseys will be numbered 1-25. Because of this, some players may have different jersey numbers while playing in CONMEBOL matches.

Note: Caps and goals are of the national league and are current as of the beginning of the season.

Recopa Sudamericana squad

Copa Sudamericana squad

:1.José Valencia replaced Joao Plata on November 18.

Winter transfers

Alex Bolaños signed with the team after the 2009 summer transfer window and was ineligible to play in the national league at the moment of signing.

Summer transfers

Enrique Vera's sporting rights belonged to Mexican club América, who transferred Vera to Atlas.

Competitions

Pre-season friendlies
The pre-season friendlies against Universidad César Vallejo was played in two matches at Liga's training grounds. The first match was between the reserves of each team, the second by the starters. The matches were played in two 30-minutes halves. Only club officials and credited media sources were allowed to watch.

La Tarde Blanca
In La Tarde Blanca, the club's official presentation for the season, Liga hammered visiting Sporting Cristal of Peru 5–0. The effortless win came with goals from veterans Ulises de la Cruz, Christian Lara (2), Édison Méndez, and recently signed Hernán Barcos.

Other friendlies
LDU Quito has accepted an invitation to play against Serie B team LDU Loja for their official debut of the season.

Alfonso Obregón's farewell match
A testimonial match was organized for the retirement of longtime midfielder and former team captain Alfonso Obregón. The match was played at La Casa Blanca on May 16. The game pitted current LDU Quito players against a team called Alfonso Obregón & Friends, composed of famous Liga and Ecuadorian footballers of the past. The legends team would be managed by former Liga manager, and two-time Serie A winning manager with Liga, Leonel Montoya. Alfonso Obregón would play a half for each team in the match.

Serie A

2010 will be LDU Quito's 49th season in the Serie A.

First stage

Second stage

Third stage

Recopa Sudamericana

As the 2009 Copa Sudamericana champion, LDU Quito played a two-legged tie against the 2009 Copa Libertadores champion Estudiantes de La Plata. LDU Quito successfully defended their title after winning the first leg 2–1 and drawing the second leg 0–0. They became the third team to win back-to-back Recopa Sudamericanas.

Copa Suruga Bank

As the 2009 Copa Sudamericana champion, LDU Quito played a single match against the 2009 J.League Cup champion FC Tokyo.

Copa Sudamericana

LDU Quito qualified to their 7th Copa Sudamericana as the defending champion. They entered the competition in the Round of 16.

Player statistics

See also
2010 in Ecuadorian football

References

External links
Official website 
LDU Quito (3) - Manta (0)
LDU Quito (4) - Manta (2)
LDU Quito (2) - Independiente del Valle (0) 1st goal
Deportivo Quito (1) - LDU Quito (1)
LDU Quito (1) - Universidad Católica (0)
Universidad Católica (2) - LDU Quito (1)
LDU Quito (3) - El Nacional (1) 1st goal
LDU Quito (2) - Emelec (0)

2010
Ecuadorian football clubs 2010 season